Hatherton is a civil parish in the district of South Staffordshire, Staffordshire, England. It contains three listed buildings that are recorded in the National Heritage List for England.  All the listed buildings are designated at Grade II, the lowest of the three grades, which is applied to "buildings of national importance and special interest".  The listed buildings consist of a public house, a lodge and a small country house.


Buildings

References

Citations

Sources

Lists of listed buildings in Staffordshire